In computer science, an attributed graph grammar is a class of graph grammar that associates vertices with a set of attributes and rewrites with functions on attributes.  In the algebraic approach to graph grammars, they are usually formulated using the double-pushout approach or the single-pushout approach.

Implementation
AGG, a rule-based visual language that directly expresses attributed graph grammars using the single-pushout approach has been developed at TU Berlin for many years.

Notes

References
.
Ehrig,  Heckel,  Korff, Lowe,  Ribeiro,   Wagner and Corradini, 1997.  Algebraic  Approaches  to  Graph Transformation  - Part  II: Single  Pushout  Approach  and  Comparison  with  Double  Pushout Approach. Pp. 247-312 of (Rozenberg, 1997).                                                                

Graph rewriting